Johann Martin (2 January 1893 – 21 December 1959) was an Estonian athlete. He competed in the men's pole vault at the 1912 Summer Olympics, representing the Russian Empire, and the 1920 Summer Olympics, representing Estonia.

References

1893 births
1959 deaths
Athletes (track and field) at the 1912 Summer Olympics
Athletes (track and field) at the 1920 Summer Olympics
Estonian male pole vaulters
Male pole vaulters from the Russian Empire
Olympic athletes of Estonia
Olympic competitors for the Russian Empire
Place of birth missing